Otta Nanayam is a 2005 Malayalam language film directed by Suresh Kannan and written by Kaloor Dennis. It stars Dinu Dennis and Priyamani in the lead roles, with music composed by S. P. Venkatesh.

Story

The film tells the story of Aravindan (Dinu Dennis), a poor person from lower-middle-class family who was forced to join a colony of beggars so he could make some  money for the liver operation of his ailing mother. This is where he meets Chippy (Priyamani), who lives the life of a beggar with poor children.  The film shows the organized begging racket in cities, exploitation by anti-social elements and sad life of the people who are initially forced into this profession and do not get a chance for a better life.

Cast

Dinu Dennis, the son of writer Kaloor Dennis is the hero.

Production 
During the film shooting at Ernakulam Junction railway station, Priyamani was mistaken for beggar since she was asking for alms from passengers along with real life beggars.

Soundtrack 
The film's soundtrack contains 3 songs, all composed by S. P. Venkitesh and Lyrics by O. N. V. Kurup.

References

External links
 

2005 films
2000s Malayalam-language films